Asker Fotball is the football department of Norwegian sports club Asker SK from Asker.

The women's football team is one of the most successful clubs ever in Norway, with 6 top flight championships and 5 cup championships. Due to financial difficulties at the end of 2008, the team's licence to play in the Toppserien was revoked; the team members then joined Stabæk IF's football group, Stabæk Fotball, which set up a new women's team. NFF gave Asker's place in the Toppserien to Stabæk Fotball. Asker's second team became Asker's first team, playing in the 2. divisjon, and they now have a recruiting arrangement with Stabæk Fotball.

The men's team currently play in the 3. divisjon, the fourth tier of the Norwegian football league system.

History

Best achievements
The men's team played in the Norwegian top flight between 1951 and 1959. In 1951 they were runners-up in the Norwegian cup.

The women's team won all its league matches in the 1998 season. The men's division did the same thing in 2005, though in the 3. divisjon.

Match-fixing allegations

On 13 July 2012, four players – one of them from Asker – were arrested by police due to match-fixing allegations in games involving Aker and Follo FK. Asker's 7–1 loss to Frigg was deemed suspicious because of the odd scoreline and the substantial bets placed on the game.

Recent history

Men's team
{|class="wikitable"
|-bgcolor="#efefef"
! Season
!
! Pos.
! Pl.
! W
! D
! L
! GS
! GA
! P
!Cup
!Notes
|-
|2001
|2. divisjon, section 1
|align=right bgcolor="#FFCCCC"| 12
|align=right|26||align=right|8||align=right|5||align=right|13
|align=right|42||align=right|56||align=right|29
||First round
|Relegated to 3. divisjon
|-
|2002
|3. divisjon, section 8
|align=right |2
|align=right|22||align=right|15||align=right|3||align=right|4
|align=right|80||align=right|32||align=right|48
||
|
|-
|2003
|3. divisjon, section 1
|align=right |1
|align=right|22||align=right|15||align=right|2||align=right|5
|align=right|50||align=right|23||align=right|47
||First round
|Lost playoffs for promotion
|-
|2004
|3. divisjon, section 8
|align=right |3
|align=right|22||align=right|14||align=right|3||align=right|5
|align=right|54||align=right|26||align=right|45
||First round
|
|-
|2005
|3. divisjon, section 4
|align=right |1
|align=right|20||align=right|20||align=right|0||align=right|0
|align=right|79||align=right|10||align=right|60
||First round
|Lost playoffs for promotion
|-
|2006
|3. divisjon, section 8
|align=right bgcolor=#DDFFDD| 1
|align=right|22||align=right|20||align=right|0||align=right|2
|align=right|103||align=right|26||align=right|60
||First round
|Promoted to 2. divisjon
|-
|2007
|2. divisjon, section 2
|align=right |2
|align=right|26||align=right|15||align=right|7||align=right|4
|align=right|72||align=right|33||align=right|52
||First round
|
|-
|2008
|2. divisjon, section 4
|align=right |6
|align=right|26||align=right|14||align=right|2||align=right|10
|align=right|58||align=right|52||align=right|44
||Third round
|
|-
|2009
|2. divisjon, section 4
|align=right |3
|align=right|26||align=right|15||align=right|4||align=right|7
|align=right|63||align=right|31||align=right|49
||Third round
|
|-
|2010
|2. divisjon, section 1
|align=right bgcolor=#DDFFDD| 1
|align=right|26||align=right|17||align=right|6||align=right|3
|align=right|71||align=right|30||align=right|57
||Second round
|Promoted to 1. divisjon
|-
|2011
|1. divisjon
|align=right bgcolor="#FFCCCC"| 13
|align=right|30||align=right|9||align=right|7||align=right|14
|align=right|38||align=right|56||align=right|34
||Third round
|Relegated to 2. divisjon
|-
|2012
|2. divisjon, section 4
|align=right |4
|align=right|26||align=right|14||align=right|5||align=right|7
|align=right|54||align=right|36||align=right|47
||Fourth round
|
|-
|2013
|2. divisjon, section 1
|align=right |2
|align=right|26||align=right|17||align=right|5||align=right|4
|align=right|80||align=right|37||align=right|56
||Third round
|
|-
|2014
|2. divisjon, section 1
|align=right bgcolor="#FFCCCC"| 13
|align=right|26||align=right|5||align=right|6||align=right|15
|align=right|36||align=right|50||align=right|21
||Second round
|Relegated to 3. divisjon
|-
|2015
|3. divisjon, section 2
|align=right bgcolor=#DDFFDD| 1
|align=right|26||align=right|24||align=right|2||align=right|0
|align=right|151||align=right|19||align=right|74
||First round
|Promoted to 2. divisjon
|-
|2016 
|2. divisjon, section 4
|align=right|5
|align=right|26||align=right|13||align=right|4||align=right|9
|align=right|52||align=right|44||align=right|43
||Third round
|
|-
|2017 
|2. divisjon, section 1
|align=right|3
|align=right|26||align=right|13||align=right|8||align=right|5
|align=right|50||align=right|36||align=right|47
||Second round
|
|-
|2018 
|2. divisjon, section 1
|align=right|4
|align=right|26||align=right|14||align=right|3||align=right|9
|align=right|53||align=right|31||align=right|45
||Second round
|
|-
|2019
|2. divisjon, section 2
|align=right|4
|align=right|26||align=right|13||align=right|7||align=right|6
|align=right|39||align=right|28||align=right|46
||Second round
|
|-
|2020
|2. divisjon, section 2
|align=right|2
|align=right|19||align=right|10||align=right|7||align=right|2
|align=right|38||align=right|21||align=right|37
||Cancelled
|Lost playoffs for promotion
|-
|2021
|2. divisjon, section 1
|align=right|3
|align=right|26||align=right|15||align=right|4||align=right|7
|align=right|60||align=right|37||align=right|49
||First round
|
|-
|2022
|2. divisjon, section 2
|align=right bgcolor="#FFCCCC"| 13
|align=right|26||align=right|6||align=right|6||align=right|14
|align=right|32||align=right|47||align=right|24
||First round
|Relegated to 3. divisjon
|}
Source:

Women's team
{|class="wikitable"
|-bgcolor="#efefef"
! Season
!
! Pos.
! Pl.
! W
! D
! L
! GS
! GA
! P
!Cup
!Notes
|-
|2001
|Toppserien
|align=right |4
|align=right|18||align=right|11||align=right|2||align=right|5
|align=right|59||align=right|26||align=right|35
|bgcolor=silver|Final
|
|-
|2002
|Toppserien
|align=right bgcolor=silver|2
|align=right|18||align=right|14||align=right|2||align=right|2
|align=right|60||align=right|9||align=right|47
||Quarterfinal
|
|-
|2003
|Toppserien
|align=right bgcolor=cc9966|3
|align=right|18||align=right|12||align=right|3||align=right|3
|align=right|54||align=right|20||align=right|39
||Quarterfinal
|
|-
|2004
|Toppserien
|align=right|4
|align=right|18||align=right|9||align=right|4||align=right|5
|align=right|37||align=right|23||align=right|31
|bgcolor=silver|Final
|
|-
|2005
|Toppserien
|align=right bgcolor="#FFCCCC"| 7
|align=right|18||align=right|7||align=right|3||align=right|8
|align=right|34||align=right|30||align=right|24
|bgcolor=gold|Winners
|Relegated because their license was revoked
|-
|2006
|1. divisjon
|align=right bgcolor=#DDFFDD| 1
|align=right|18||align=right|16||align=right|0||align=right|2
|align=right|110||align=right|13||align=right|48
|bgcolor=silver|Final
|Promoted to Toppserien
|-
|2007
|Toppserien
|align=right bgcolor=cc9966|3
|align=right|22||align=right|15||align=right|5||align=right|2
|align=right|68||align=right|18||align=right|50
|bgcolor=silver|Final
|
|-
|2008
|Toppserien
|align=right bgcolor=cc9966|3
|align=right|22||align=right|14||align=right|3||align=right|5
|align=right|53||align=right|26||align=right|45
|bgcolor=cc9966|Semifinal
|Team folded
|}

References

External links

Asker Football Women
Asker Football Men

Football clubs in Norway
Fotball Herrer
Sport in Akershus
Association football clubs established in 1889
1889 establishments in Norway